This is a list of Japanese infantry divisions of the Imperial Japanese Army. During World War II, the IJA organized three Guards Divisions and over 220 infantry divisions of various types(A/Reinforced,B/Standard,C/Counter-insurgency). On 7 December the IJA had two divisions serving in Japan/Korea and 50 serving abroad, most in China. During the war another 117 were raised for foreign service and 56 were raised for national defense. These totaled 223 including the Imperial Guard. Additionally one parachute and four armored divisions were formed. Of this total no more than 35, that is one fifth of the IJA infantry division total, fought in the Pacific theatre.

Guard Divisions 
The Konoe Imperial Guard of Japan was originally one Imperial Guards Division until the beginning of the Second Sino-Japanese War.  It was expanded during World War II into three Guards Divisions:
 
Konoe Imperial Guards Division
1st Guards Division
2nd Guards Division
3rd Guards Division

Infantry Divisions 
The first 18 divisions were originally formed as square divisions, and after 1938, and the remainder were formed either as triangular divisions or as binary security divisions. 16 coastal defense divisions with numbers from 140th to 160th (except for 148th and 149th divisions) were also formed as square divisions.

1st Division
2nd Division
3rd Division
4th Division
5th Division
6th Division
7th Division
8th Division
9th Division
10th Division
11th Division
12th Division
13th Division
14th Division
15th Division
16th Division
17th Division
18th Division
19th Division
20th Division
21st Division
22nd Division
23rd Division
24th Division
25th Division
26th Division
27th Division
28th Division
29th Division
30th Division
31st Division
32nd Division
33rd Division
34th Division
35th Division
36th Division
37th Division
38th Division
39th Division
40th Division
41st Division
42nd Division
43rd Division
44th Division
46th Division
47th Division
48th Division
49th Division
50th Division
51st Division
52nd Division
53rd Division
54th Division
55th Division
56th Division
57th Division
58th Division
59th Division
60th Division
61st Division
62nd Division
63rd Division
64th Division
65th Division
66th Division
68th Division
69th Division
70th Division
71st Division
72nd Division
73rd Division
77th Division
79th Division
81st Division
84th Division
86th Division
88th Division
89th Division
91st Division
93rd Division
94th Division
96th Division
100th Division
101st Division
102nd Division
103rd Division
104th Division
105th Division
106th Division
107th Division
108th Division
109th Division
110th Division
111th Division
112th Division
114th Division
115th Division
116th Division
117th Division
118th Division
119th Division
120th Division
121st Division
122nd Division
123rd Division
124th Division
125th Division
126th Division
127th Division
128th Division
129th Division
130th Division
131st Division
132nd Division
133rd Division
134th Division
135th Division
136th Division
137th Division
138th Division
139th Division
140th Division
142nd Division
143rd Division
144th Division
145th Division
146th Division
147th Division
148th Division
149th Division
150th Division
151st Division
152nd Division
153rd Division
154th Division
155th Division
156th Division
157th Division
158th Division
160th Division
161st Division
201st Division
202nd Division
205th Division
206th Division
209th Division
212th Division
214th Division
216th Division
221st Division
222nd Division
224th Division
225th Division
229th Division
230th Division
231st Division
234th Division
303rd Division
308th Division
312th Division
316th Division
320th Division
321st Division
322nd Division
344th Division
351st Division
354th Division
355th Division

Sources 

 Madej, W. Victor, Japanese Armed Forces Order of Battle, 1937-1945 [2 vols] Allentown, PA: 1981

 The Japanese Mutumi troop encyclopedia 陸　軍　編

 
Infantry
Lists of military units and formations of World War II
Infantry
Infantry divisions
Lists of divisions (military formations)